Field Brook (also known as Fields Brook) is a tributary of Tunkhannock Creek in Susquehanna County and Wyoming County, in Pennsylvania, in the United States. The stream has one named tributary, which is known as East Branch Field Brook. The surficial geology in the vicinity of Field Brook consists of alluvium, Wisconsinan Till, alluvial terrace, alluvial fan, bedrock, wetlands, and a lake. The watershed of the stream is designated as a Coldwater Fishery and a Migratory Fishery.

Course

Field Brook begins in a pond in Lathrop Township, Susquehanna County. It flows south and south-southeast for a few tenths of a mile before turning southwest and entering a lake. The stream then turns south-southeast for more than a mile, flowing through a valley and passing Miller Hill and Mulligan Hill. It then turns south for several tenths of a mile before turning southeast for several tenths of a mile. At this point, the stream exits Lathrop Township and Susquehanna County.

Upon exiting Susquehanna County, Field Brook enters Nicholson Township, Wyoming County and continues flowing southeast. After several tenths of a mile, it receives East Branch Field Brook, its only named tributary, from the left, and turns south-southeast. After more than a mile, the stream's valley broadens and it turns south-southwest, crossing Pennsylvania Route 92. The stream then turns southeast and then east, after a short distance reaching its confluence with Tunkhannock Creek.

Tributaries
Field Brook has one named tributary: East Branch Field Brook.

Geography and geology

The surficial geology near the mouth of Field Brook consists mostly of alluvium, but there is some till known as Wisconsinan Till in this reach as well. In the stream's middle reaches, the surficial geology alongside it consists mostly of alluvium, while the rest of the valley is mostly Wisconsinan Till. There are also patches of alluvial fan, alluvial terrace, and bedrock consisting of sandstone and shale. In the upper reaches, the surficial geology is mostly Wisconsinan Till, but there is a patch of alluvium, wetlands, and a lake.

Watershed
The mouth of the stream is in the United States Geological Survey quadrangle of Factoryville. However, its source is in the quadrangle of Hop Bottom. The mouth of the stream is within a mile of Nicholson.

As of 2015, a dam known as the McNamara Dam is located on a tributary of Field Brook. It is considered to pose a threat to public safety, so there has been a proposal to remove the dam, causing  of stream to flow freely again.

History
Field Brook was entered into the Geographic Names Information System on August 2, 1979. Its identifier in the Geographic Names Information System is 1174737. The stream is also known as Fields Brook. This variant name appears in Israel C. White's 1883 book The geology of the North Branch Susquehanna River Region in the six counties of Wyoming, Lackawanna, Luzerne, Columbia, Montour and Northumberland.

Biology
The drainage basin of Field Brook is designated as a Coldwater Fishery and a Migratory Fishery.

See also
Monroe Creek (Tunkhannock Creek), next tributary of Tunkhannock Creek going downstream
Horton Creek (Tunkhannock Creek), next tributary of Tunkhannock Creek going upstream
List of rivers of Pennsylvania

References

Rivers of Susquehanna County, Pennsylvania
Rivers of Wyoming County, Pennsylvania
Tributaries of Tunkhannock Creek
Rivers of Pennsylvania